Bryan Edward Duncan (born March 16, 1953) is an American contemporary Christian music artist. He is known for being lead singer of the group Sweet Comfort Band, His band Bryan Duncan & the Nehosoul Band, but best known for his very successful solo career where he was a major act on the Myrrh Records label. He is Founder of online recovery shows "Radio Rehab/ Road To Redemption" while continuing as a solo artist with the 2019 Shine release. He has been the recipient of four Dove Awards and nominated 6 Times for male vocalist of the year in Christian music's Dove Awards as well as a winner of Grammy Award for Andrea Crouch Tribute, also multiple Grammy nominations.

Career
Duncan started his career in 1973 with the Jesus music band Sweet Comfort Band which later transitioned to contemporary Christian music. After the band broke up in 1984 Duncan started his solo career. During this time, Duncan released several number one songs including "Traces of Heaven", "Things are Gonna Change", "United We Stand" and "Don't Look Away" from the Slow Revival album; "Love Takes Time", "You Don't Leave Me Lonely", "Into My Heart", "When It Comes to Love" and "I'll Not Forget You" from the Mercy album; and "A Heart Like Mine" from the compilation My Utmost for His Highest.

In 2003, Duncan formed the Nehosoul Band with Ricky B. Rogers (bass player, music director, co-writer), composer and keyboardist Phil Curry, guitarist Walter Finch, and drummer Sam Matthews. The band released the album Music City Live in 2004, A Nehosoul Christmas in 2005, and Still Dancin in 2008. In 2013, Bryan reunited with the Sweet Comfort Band. In April 2013, the Sweet Comfort Band released the album, The Waiting is Over.

Duncan has sold in excess of 1 million records, released 18 solo albums, and appeared on several compilation projects. He has released three solo video projects and one joint tour video as well as having done the video for Left Behind: The Movie. Recently, Duncan started his own record label called Red Road Records.

Duncan created a non-profit on-line radio show and podcast entitled "Radio Rehab" to encourage people in daily life. He released two books in 2010: Hog Wash, a book for bikers and Dear God...Really? (prayers You Won't Hear In Church' and 'Spoke To God...He Said' (5 second devotions).

Duncan, Rogers, and Vail Johnson (of the Kenny G band) wrote together for Conversations, Duncan's first solo project since 2000's Joyride. It was released in 2012 on Red Road Records. Followed Conversations with 'Bryan Duncan and Friends Live Experience', and 'Shine'

2022 began a podcast called Nutshell Sermons, (from your friend on the back row)

 Personal life 
Duncan attended Southeastern University in Lakeland, Florida.
Attended Vanguard University in Costa Mesa Ca. 1972-73

Discography

With Sweet Comfort Band
1977: Sweet Comfort (Maranatha! Records)
1979: Breaking the Ice (Light Records)
1980: Hold on Tight (Light Records)
1981: Hearts of Fire (Light Records)
1982: Cutting Edge (Light Records)
1984: Perfect Timing (Light Records)
2013: The Waiting Is Over (Shelter Sound Music, Inc.)

Solo
1985: Have Yourself Committed (Light Records)
1986: Holy Rollin (Light Records) (Remastered CD, Girder Records, 2021)
1987: Whistlin' In the Dark (Modern Art Records) (Remastered CD, Girder Records, 2021)
1989: Strong Medicine (Myrrh Records) (Remastered CD, Girder Records, 2021)
1990: Anonymous Confessions of a Lunatic Friend (Myrrh Records)
1992: Mercy (Myrrh Records)
1994: Slow Revival (Myrrh Records)
1995: My Utmost for His Highest: Quiet Prayers (Myrrh Records)
1995: Christmas is Jesus (Myrrh Records)
1995: Unidos En El (Myrrh Records)
1996: Blue Skies (Myrrh Records)
1998: The Last Time I Was Here (Myrrh Records)
1999: Love Takes Time: 17 Timeless Classics (Myrrh Records)
2000: Joyride (Diadem Music)
2012: Conversations (Red Road Records, Make It Timeless)
2014: The Ultimate Collection (Word Records)
2016: Bryan Duncan & Friends - The Live Experience (Make It Timeless)
2019: Shine (Make It Timeless)

With The NehoSoul Band
2004: Music City Live (Red Road Records)
2005: A NehoSoul Christmas (Red Road Records)
2009: Still Dancin' (Red Road Records)

Awards

Grammy Awards
1996: Best Pop/Contemporary Gospel Album  for Tribute – The Songs of Andrae Crouch (various artists)

GMA Dove Awards
1996: Special Event Album of the Year for My Utmost for His Highest (various artists)
1997: Inspirational Album of the Year for Quiet Prayers (My Utmost for His Highest)
1997: Special Event Album of the Year for Tribute – The Songs of Andrae Crouch (various artists)
1999: Long Form Music Video of the Year for My Utmost for His Highest – The Concert'' (various artists)

References

External links
 
YouTube
Bryan Duncan Interview at Voyage Radio 2.0 Podcast, 2009
Bryan Duncan interviewed by Dr. Blogstein's Radio Happy Hour
Bryan Duncan interviewed and debuts "Still Dancin'" CD on Lifespring (podcast)
Soul-Audio Reviews Latest Album, Still Dancin'
Bryan Duncan bio at The Official Sweet Comfort Band website

1953 births
American performers of Christian music
American rhythm and blues singer-songwriters
American soul singers
Living people
Musicians from Riverside, California
Singer-songwriters from California
Southeastern University (Florida) alumni